Caladenia flaccida, commonly known as the flaccid spider orchid, is a plant in the orchid family Orchidaceae and is endemic to eastern Australia. It is a ground orchid with a single hairy leaf and up to three cream-coloured, pinkish or red flowers with long, thread-like, glandular tips on the sepals and petals.

Description
The sepals and petals are linear in shape near their base but suddenly taper after about one-fifth of their length to a hairy, thread-like glandular tail. The lateral sepals are a similar size and shape to the dorsal sepal and the petals are slightly shorter. The labellum curves forward and has broad, white-tipped teeth on the sides and two rows of crowded, cream-coloured, stalked calli along its mid-line, decreasing in size towards the tip. Flowering occurs from August to October.

Taxonomy and naming
Caladenia flaccida was first formally described by David Jones in 1991 and the description was published in Australian Orchid Research. The specific epithet (flaccida) is a Latin word meaning "weak" or "drooping", referring to the drooping sepals and petals.

Distribution and habitat
Flaccid spider orchid grows on ridges and slopes in Callitris forest in Queensland, New South Wales, South Australia and possibly Victoria.

References

flaccida
Plants described in 1991
Endemic orchids of Australia
Orchids of Queensland
Orchids of New South Wales
Orchids of South Australia
Orchids of Victoria (Australia)
Taxa named by David L. Jones (botanist)